Chester "Chet" Lauck (February 9, 1902 – February 21, 1980) was a comic actor who played the character of Lum Edwards on the classic American radio comedy Lum and Abner.

Early life and career
Chester Lauck was born in Alleene, Arkansas and 
raised in Mena, Arkansas. He graduated from Mena High School in 1920. In Mena, Chet met his future comedy partner Norris Goff. Though both began as blackface comics, they soon found success on Hot Springs, Arkansas radio station KTHS with a weekly rural comedy skit, basing their characters on acquaintances from Waters, Arkansas. This led to an NBC network radio series, broadcast first from Chicago, Illinois, in 1931. The radio series aired on Mutual, CBS, and ABC at various times during its 1931–54 run. It was sponsored by Quaker Oats, the Ford Dealers of America, Horlick's Malted Milk, Postum, Alka-Seltzer, and Frigidaire.

In addition to starring as storekeeper Lum (full name Columbus Edwards, with surname usually pronounced "Eddards"), Lauck also played several other recurring characters, including Cedric Weehunt, Grandpappy Spears, and Snake Hogan. He reprised his radio role, opposite Goff, in seven motion pictures between 1940 and 1956. Lauck adopted grey hair and a moustache on-camera, to better match the picture most audiences would have of his radio character. 

For a brief time during the 1950s he bought and upgraded a ranch fifteen miles west of Las Vegas, later bought by Howard Hughes. It was turned into Spring Mountain Ranch State Park.

In 1956, Lauck began working as an executive with Continental Oil in Houston, Texas, specializing in public relations and advertising. He appeared as himself as well as Lum in a series of television commercials for Conoco on the programs Whirlybirds (1957–60) and The Blue Angels (1960–61). On August 27, 1957, he appeared as a guest challenger on To Tell the Truth.

Upon retirement from Continental Oil, Lauck moved to Hot Springs, Arkansas and co-founded an advertising agency with longtime associate Harlan Hobbs and son Chester Lauck Jr. Lauck Sr. was highly regarded as an after-dinner speaker and maintained a hectic schedule of appearances across the nation. During his California years, Lauck owned race horses which competed in Santa Anita. This expertise led to a 1970 appointment by Arkansas Governor Dale Bumpers in which Lauck became Commissioner of the Arkansas State Racing Commission.

In his later years, Lauck recorded new introductions for commercial cassette releases of the series and for syndication.

Death
Lauck died in a hospital in Hot Springs, Arkansas, on February 21, 1980, aged 78.

Honors
Lauck was inducted into the National Association of Broadcasters Hall of Fame in the radio division.

Filmography

References

External links

 

1902 births
1980 deaths
Male actors from Arkansas
American male radio actors
American male film actors
People from Mena, Arkansas
People from Seal Beach, California
University of Arkansas alumni
20th-century American male actors